Chloropaschia afflicta is a species of snout moth in the genus Chloropaschia. It is found in Guatemala.

References

Moths described in 1922
Epipaschiinae